Tiger Lily is an unincorporated community in central Alberta within the County of Barrhead No. 11, located  northwest Highway 18,  northwest of St. Albert.  It is named for the tiger lily flower.

Tiger Lily is a retirement and tourist destination.  It is home to several retirement communities and Clear Lake Park, a camp and resort.

A ranch near Tiger Lily sells beef directly to the public.

References 

Localities in the County of Barrhead No. 11